Slaven Dizdarević (born 3 August 1981 Sarajevo, Yugoslavia) is a decathlete who has represented Slovakia at the 2008 Summer Olympics in Beijing. He holds the national record in the heptathlon. After the sports career Slaven found his passion in art as a painter and photographer.

External links 
Slaven Dizdarević's profile on worldathletics.org
Art page: www.slavendizdarevic.com
 Slaven Dizdarević Ambassador at TIQ 2 Sports

1981 births
Living people
Slovak decathletes
Olympic athletes of Slovakia
Athletes (track and field) at the 2008 Summer Olympics
Slovak people of Bosnia and Herzegovina descent